The Hingorja are a Muslim community found in the state of a province of Sindh in Pakistan. They are one of a number of communities of pastoral nomads found in the Banni region of Kutch.

History and origin

The Hingorja claim descent from Samma Jat tribe who were devotees of Hinglaj Mata, whose temple is situated in Hingol in Baluchistan. They were converted to Islam, about five centuries ago, and migrated to Kutch in search of pasture. The Hingorja perceive themselves to be Muslim Rajputs.

Present circumstances

The community is concentrated in the villages of Nandi Daddar, Mota Banda and Dumcara in the taluka of Bhuj, in the Kutch District of Gujarat, and the neighbouring districts of Badin and Tharparkar in Sindh.  They speak a dialect of Kutchi, with substantial Sindhi loan words. The community is endogamous, but does marry with other Samma communities, such as the Hingora. They are divided into a number of clans, the main ones being the Malwani, Jeshwani, Parian, Rebani and Kheera.

The Hingorja are a community of Maldhari cattle breeders. In addition to cattle breeding, the Hingorja are also cultivators, and landless agricultural labourers. Like other Kutchi communities, many of them have migrated to other parts of India in search of employment.

See also
Hingora
Samma

References

Social groups of Gujarat
Tribes of Kutch
Maldhari communities
Muslim communities of India
Sindhi tribes
Jat tribes

Sindhi tribes in India
Muslim communities of Gujarat